Chung Mong-joon or Chung Mong Joon (born October 17, 1951) is a South Korean businessman and politician. He is the sixth son of Chung Ju-yung, founder of Hyundai, the second-largest South Korean chaebol before its breakup in 2003. He remains the controlling shareholder of a Hyundai offshoot, Hyundai Heavy Industries Group, parent of the world's largest shipbuilding company. He is also the chairman of the board of the University of Ulsan and Ulsan College in Ulsan, South Korea. He is the founder and the honorary chairman of The Asan Institute for Policy Studies. He was Honorary Vice-President of FIFA and president of the South Korean football association.

Political career and personal life
Chung became a politician when he was elected as an assembly man in 1988 and served consecutive 7 terms in two different electoral districts. Initially, he was elected in Dong District, Ulsan, where the predominant share of the population consisted of employees of the Hyundai Heavy Industries Group, its affiliated companies' employees, and their families. Most of other population in Dong District run businesses related with serving those workers and their families. Chung served as a representative of this particular district for 20 years. He joined Grand National Party in 2007 shortly before 2007 South Korean presidential election, declaring his support to that party's presidential candidate Lee Myung-bak. As a member of Grand National Party, he switched his electoral district to Dongjak District, Seoul, and represented there as an assembly man for 2 terms until 2014 when he had to give up that seat to run for mayor of Seoul, but the election was lost to Park Won-soon leaving no political titles for Chung after. Grand National Party changed its name to Saenuri Party in 2012. Chung had announced his candidacy for FIFA president. However he was banned from all football activities for six years by FIFA Ethics Committee in October 2015. In 2018, the ban was reduced to 15 months by the Court of Arbitration for Sport due to "mitigating factors."

Presidential campaign of 2002
In 2002, he ran for the presidency, but later gave up his candidacy supporting Millennium Democratic Party's candidate Roh Moo-hyun. Their coalition was motivated to prevent Grand National Party from winning the presidential election. South Korean regionalism became much more serious and antagonistic under President Kim Dae-jung's term. President Kim is the only South Korean president coming from Jeolla province, whereas all the other South Korean presidents since General Park Chung-hee's military coup in 1961 have been from Gyeongsang province. Those of Koreans who despised Jeolla province supported Grand National Party, and the party exploited such sentiments for its political gains of denouncing President Kim and his government. Throughout President Kim' term, Grand National Party was accused by civil rights groups and media for instigating anti Jeolla sentiments. Chung and Roh Moo-hyun objected such self-destroying regionalism in South Korea, and advocated reconciliation between Jeolla and Gyeongsang provinces. Their coalition was intended to defeat the party which was seen to exploit regionalism.

Chung participated in Roh's presidential campaign up to the last day before the election, Dec 19, 2002. On Dec 18 afternoon, before the crowd of his supporters in Myeong-dong, Seoul, Roh suggested Chung Dong-young and Choo Mi-ae as viable choices of candidates for the next presidential race in 2007. Roh suggested those Democratic Party's politicians when he saw some of the crowd having slogans "Chung Mong-joon for the next presidential candidate" Roh's suggestion was not intended to exclude Chung as a presidential candidate, but to encourage and to praise his party's politicians in return to their supports to his presidential campaign.
Several hours after this, Chung's spokeswoman officially announced Chung's withdrawal from supporting Roh. Roh's presidential camp was stunned by this, and Roh tried to allay Chung by visiting his home in person on the very last night before the presidential election, but Chung kept his front door closed and refused to see Roh.  Nevertheless, Roh went on to win the election on the following day for the victory of all of those Koreans who wished to see regionalism end in South Korea.

Chung's joining of Grand National Party is an irony because his withdrawal from the presidential race in 2002 supporting Roh Moo-hyun was responsible for Grand National Party's failure in winning the presidential election. The party's candidate Lee Hoi-chang received absolute support from conservative or anti Jeolla voters. By the help of Chung's withdrawal, the election became bipolar between Roh and Lee, and Roh turned out to be a winner receiving exclusive support from reform-minded Korean voters. Grand National Party had to wait another 5 years to produce a president from this defeat. Also his declaration to support Lee Myung-bak when he joined Grand National Party is an irony. When Chung's father Chung Ju-yung ran for the presidency in 1992, Lee Myung-bak supported Kim Young-sam instead of Chung Ju-yung despite the fact that Lee made fortune and fame when he worked at Hyundai. Chung Ju-yung even bought him a luxurious house when Lee worked for Chung Ju-yung. So Chung supported his father's ex subordinate who in fact hadn't supported his father in earlier presidential race.

Chung's brother Chung Mong-hun, then the president of Hyundai Asan who pioneered South and North joint Mount Kumgang tour business, committed suicide on Aug 4, 2003 when he was investigated by prosecutors for his alleged $400 million cash remit to North Korea shortly before 2000 North-South summit. Initially this suspicion was raised from US when Congressional Research Service reported such allegation from CIA source on March 5, 2002. Upon hearing of such report, Grand National Party made use of this suspicion to attack the legitimacy of President Kim Dae-jung's government, and demanded thorough investigation through hearings and independent special prosecutors. Several weeks before leaving his office, President Kim gave an apology and advised no investigation for this matter for fear of aggravating North and South's relation, and Chung Mong-hun also confessed much of the allegations to public in his final attempt to evade investigation. But Grand National Party was resolute in its demand for formal investigation. Shortly after Roh's inauguration, Grand National Party passed the law entitling special prosecutors to investigate this case, taking advantage of its majority seats in National Assembly. Roh's regime wasn't able to refuse the demand of investigation, and Chung Mong-hun committed suicide when he was investigated about the use of $15 million worth of Korean won which was suspected to had been money laundered after its withdrawal from Hyundai's bank accounts. In fact, the money wasn't part of $400 million cash remittance to North Korea. North Korea blamed Grand National Party immediately after Chung Mong-hun's suicide. So Chung Mong-joon has joined the party which could be considered to be responsible for his brother's death, but Chung blames President Roh instead. In his autobiography which was published in 2011, Chung argues that President Roh didn't refuse Grand National Party's demand of investigation because he believes Roh actually wanted to investigate his brother to revenge on his withdrawal of supporting Roh in 2002 presidential election.

There is another ironical point behind Chung's joining of Grand National Party. The party tried to dig and disclose Chung's private life information to defame him in 2002 presidential election These included his alleged prior diagnosis of mental disorder in school years, his cheating incidence during final exam in college years, questionable identity of his real mother, discredit of his Johns Hopkins University doctoral degree, etc. Some of these rumors have turned out to be true. In conclusion Chung settled at the party which had been at odds with him before.

Chung was known to be suspended and repeat courses for cheating final exam when he was a freshman in Seoul National University. He was caught by an exam monitor when he was peeping at some other classmate's exam over shoulder during final exam. He was reported to disciplinary committee and got such punishment after the incidence. Chung gave an excuse for this, saying he cheated final exam trying to finish it early to go out with his friends. Chung is the only known public figure in Korean history having such record.

Chung's real mother is unknown. When he ran for the South Korean presidency in 2002, Grand National Party explored this point. They speculated about the identity of Chung's real mother. They speculated that his real mother could be a house maid, a geisha, or a particular traditional musician whom Chung Ju-yung had an affair with. In fact, in his interview with news reporters in 2002, Chung indicated that his real mother is someone else, saying he would reveal the truth someday. It was reported that he was crying when he was questioned about his real mother. Chung explained about his real mother in his autobiography in 2011. Chung says that when he studied in US in 1978, he received a letter from someone in Korea who claimed to be his real mother. He hurried to return to Korea, and met her at her place, according to his autobiography. Chung said that it was the first and last time that he was going to see her.

Presidential campaign of 2012
Shortly after he published his autobiography in 2011, some South Korean media reported an allegation that his shipbuilding company bought a large sum of his autobiography in order to make it known as a best seller. The media gathered that information after interviewing inside personnel, and found that Hyundai Heavy Industries Group distributed gift certificates to thousands of their employees to purchase Chung's autobiography. It was reported that they required employees to return the books along with receipts to the company after purchase, and added a special instruction not to purchase large volumes at once for fear of getting suspicions from public.

On top of publishing his autobiography, Chung also donated huge sums of money and set up a charity foundation in 2011, a year before 2012 presidential election. He contributed $200 million worth of Korean won from selling approximately 5% of his assets and established the Asan Sharing Foundation, which offers educational opportunities and financial assistance to young people from low income families. He said he funded it to commemorate his late father Chung Ju-yung, but many couldn't dismiss reasonable suspicion that his motivation was to impress the public before the presidential election. In fact, Chung didn't deny such suspicion, arguing that donation is supposed to good regardless of purpose.

Chung didn't think of Park Geun-hye as accomplished as himself before 2012 presidential election. When he decided to compete with Park, he said he was a better choice as a presidential candidate because of his educational background and work experience. When he pointed out Park's disadvantage, he argued that expertise of politics and economy is not something to be achieved in a short time. When Park Geun-hye wrote an article about North Korean issue in Foreign Affairs, Chung discredited it claiming someone else had written it under her name. Therefore, it was clear that he wouldn't miss 2012 presidential election. In 2012, he ran for the presidency, but only briefly. He was the first politician who submitted application for registration as a preliminary presidential candidate on May 1, 2012, but dropped out of the race in a couple of months. He wanted rule change for primary election so that general population choose party's presidential candidate, but he wasn't able to make this demand sound serious to Grand National Party, since Park Geun-hye's followers dominated and controlled the party. He gave up his candidacy and supported Park after. When he advertised Park at streets, he was saying to crowd that Park was prepared, and she was the one to take good care of economy and diplomacy.

Chung is losing popular support in South Korean politics now. When he ran for assemblyman in 2008, he received 54.41% of votes in Dongjak District, but for the following election in 2012, he just received 50.80% barely surviving to lose to the opposition candidate. When he ran for mayor of Seoul in 2014, he received 43.03% votes from Seoul residents, losing to then incumbent mayor of Seoul and previous civil rights activist Park Won-soon, who received 55% of the total vote. It turned out that Chung's electoral district, Dongjak voted only 41.80% for Chung whereas it gave 57.45% for Park.

Education
 Graduated, Choongang High School
 Bachelor of Arts in Economics, Seoul National University
 Master of Business Administration, Sloan School of Management, Massachusetts Institute of Technology
 Doctor of Philosophy, School of Advanced International Studies, Johns Hopkins University

Family

References

External links

 Official website
 Info on FIFA.com Website
 Chosun Daily Special Report (2002)
 BBC News profile (2002)
 Soccerphile.com interview

|-

|-

Seoul National University alumni
Paul H. Nitze School of Advanced International Studies alumni
South Korean businesspeople
Converts to Presbyterianism
Members of the National Assembly (South Korea)
1951 births
Living people
South Korean Presbyterians
People from Busan
South Korean billionaires
MIT Sloan School of Management alumni
South Korean presidential candidates, 2012
Hyundai Heavy Industries Group
Hyundai people
South Korean football executives
South Korean football chairmen and investors